The California Birth Index (CABI) is a database compiled by the California Office of Health Information and Research. The index contains birth records of all registered births in California between 1905 and 1995. Each record is an abstract of a person's birth certificate, including date of birth, full name, county of birth, gender, and mother's maiden name.

The index is available online from a number of sources. See below.

People who have been adopted are sometimes listed by their birth name, sometimes listed by their adopted name, sometimes by both and sometimes not listed at all.  The CABI is considered a valuable genealogy tool but is also criticized for privacy issues. California began statewide civil registration of births on 1 July 1905. Earlier birth records may exist in the county where the birth took place or at the church where a baptism took place.

Controversy
Critics of the index claim that the index's information aids in identity theft. Several public record websites have purchased copies of the index from the California Department of Health Services. In 2001, the San Jose Mercury News printed a story about the index, then accessible on genealogical website Rootsweb, causing numerous complaints and requests for removal from the index, and ultimately leading to the index being removed from the site.

The California Birth Index, along with the California Death Index, was at one time available free at Rootsweb. When Rootsweb was purchased by Ancestry.com, the index remained available for a time, but then was removed by Ancestry because of complaints concerning privacy violations. The index was then only available through VitalSearch and later through Family Tree Legends and FamilySearch. Ancestry has restored the index to its content, but has not restored the notes by users posted in the index when it was available on Rootsweb. Ancestry will remove individual listings upon request. California Birth Index listings on the Family Tree Legends website do not include the mother's maiden name, but listings at Ancestry.com, FamilySearch, and VitalSearch websites do.

Despite the controversy, birth records in California are public record. Any person can request and receive a copy of the birth certificate of any other person born in California.  To reduce the risk of identity theft, only certain persons may obtain an authorized copy of a birth record. All others may obtain an informational copy.  The informational copy will have the same information on it as an authorized copy, but will be stamped "INFORMATIONAL, NOT A VALID DOCUMENT TO ESTABLISH IDENTITY."

See also
Social Security Death Index
WP:BLPPRIMARY: Why you should never use the California Birth Index as a source on Wikipedia.

References

External links
 

 

 

Identity documents of the United States
Birth registration
People from California